The Sutlej or Satluj River is the longest of the five rivers that flow through the historic crossroads region of Punjab in northern India and Pakistan. The Sutlej River is also known as Satadru. It is the easternmost tributary of the Indus River. The Bhakra Dam is built around the river Sutlej to provide irrigation and other facilities to the states of Punjab, Rajasthan and Haryana.

The waters of the Sutlej are allocated to India under the Indus Waters Treaty between India and Pakistan, and are mostly diverted to irrigation canals in India like the Sirhind Canal, Bhakra Main Line and the Rajasthan canal. The mean annual flow is 14 million acre feet (MAF) upstream of Ropar barrage, downstream of the Bhakra dam. It has several major hydroelectric points, including the 1,325 MW Bhakra Dam, the 1,000 MW Karcham Wangtoo Hydroelectric Plant, and the 1,500 MW Nathpa Jhakri Dam. The drainage basin in India includes the states and union territories of Himachal Pradesh, Punjab, Ladakh and Haryana.

Course
The source of the Sutlej is west of the catchment area of Lake Rakshastal in Tibet, as springs in an ephemeral stream. Lake Rakshastal used to be part of the Sutlej river basin long ago and separated from the Sutlej due to tectonic activity. The nascent river flows at first west-northwest for about  under the Tibetan name Langqên Zangbo (Elephant River or Elephant Spring) to the Shipki La pass, entering India in Himachal Pradesh state. Ropar Wetland in Punjab state is located on the Sutlej river basin. Evidence suggests Indus Valley civilisation also flourished here. Ungti Chu and Pare Chu rivers which drain southeastern part of Ladakh are tributaries of Sutlej river.

Few centuries ago, Sutlej river was merging with the Ghaggar river to discharge in to the Arabian sea. In approx. 1797 BC, the course of the Sutlej river moved towards north to join the Beas river.

The area to the southeast on the Pakistani side of the Indian border is called the Cholistan Desert and, on the Indian side, the Thar Desert.

The Indus then flows through a gorge near Sukkur and the fertile plains region of Sindh, forming a large delta region between the border of Gujarat, India and Pakistan, finally terminating in the Arabian Sea near the port city of Karachi, Pakistan. During floods, Indus river water flows in to Indian part of Great Rann of Kutch. Thus Gujarat state of India is also a riparian state of Indus river as Rann of Kutch area lying west of Kori Creek in the state is part of the Indus River Delta.

Puranic Mention and Etymology 

In the Chaitra-Ratha Parva of Adi Parva of Mahābhārata, when sage Vasishṭha wants to commit suicide he saw the river named Haimāvata (whose source is Himavat), flooded and full of crocodiles and other aquatic monsters. So he jumps into the river. The river thinking that Vasishṭha is a mass of unquenchable fire dilated itself and flew in a hundred different directions. Henceforth the river was named śatadra (or śatadru) which means the river of a hundred courses. So, Vasishṭha landed on dry land and was unharmed.

Langqên Zangbo 

Langqên Zangbo is a river in Ngari, Tibet, China. The name Langqên, Tibetan for "elephant", is because of a valley that resembles an elephant trunk. This river is the main source of the Sutlej, a tributary of Indus River. It enters India at Shipki La pass. The source is south of Gangdise Range, in Ngari Prefecture. Its course is mainly in the Zanda County. The river drains an area of 22,760 km2, and covers a length of 309 km. The drop in height is 3,256 m. Historically, the river was the centre of the Zhangzhung Kingdom until its fall in the 8th century AD.

Geology

Sutlej is an antecedent river, which existed before the Himalayas and entrenched itself while they were rising. The Sutlej, along with all of the Punjab rivers, is thought to have drained east into the Ganges prior to 5 mya.

There is substantial geologic evidence to indicate that prior to 1700 BC, and perhaps much earlier, the Sutlej was an important tributary of the Ghaggar-Hakra River (thought to be the legendary Sarasvati River) rather than the Indus, with various authors putting the redirection from 2500 to 2000 BC, from 5000 to 3000 BC, or before 8000 BC. Geologists believe that tectonic activity created elevation changes which redirected the flow of Sutlej from the southeast to the southwest.  If the diversion of the river occurred recently (about 4000 years ago), it may have been responsible for the Ghaggar-Hakra (Saraswati) drying up, causing desertification of Cholistan and the eastern part of the modern state of Sindh, and the abandonment of Harappan settlements along the Ghaggar. However, the Sutlej may have already been captured by the Indus thousands of years earlier.

There is some evidence that the high rate of erosion caused by the modern Sutlej River has influenced the local faulting and rapidly exhumed rocks above Rampur. This would be similar to, but on a much smaller scale than, the exhumation of rocks by the Indus River in Nanga Parbat, Pakistan. The Sutlej River also exposes a double inverted metamorphic gradient.

Sutlej-Yamuna Link

The project is intended to connect the Ganges, which flows to the east coast of the subcontinent, with points west, via Pakistan. When completed, the SYL would enable inland shipping from India's east coast to its west coast (on the Arabian sea) without having to round the southern tip of India by sea, vastly shortening shipping distances, alleviating pressures on seaports, avoiding sea hazards, creating business opportunities along the route, raising real estate values, raising tax revenue, and establishing important commercial links and providing jobs for north-central India's large population. However, the proposal has met with obstacles and has been referred to the Supreme Court of India. To augment nearly 100 tmcft water availability for the needs of this link canal, Tso Moriri lake/Lingdi Nadi (a tributary of Tso Moriri lake) waters can be diverted to the Sutlej basin by digging a 10 km long gravity canal to connect to the Ungti Chu river.

History

The Upper Sutlej Valley, called Langqên Zangbo in Tibet, was once known as the Garuda Valley by the Zhangzhung, the ancient civilization of western Tibet. The Garuda Valley was the centre of their empire, which stretched many miles into the nearby Himalayas. The Zhangzhung built a towering palace in the Upper Sutlej Valley called Kyunglung, the ruins of which still exist today near the village of Moincêr, southwest of Mount Kailash (Mount Ti-se). Eventually, the Zhangzhung were conquered by the Tibetan Empire. Sutlej river also formed the eastern boundary of the Sikh Empire under Maharajah Ranjit Singh.

Today, the Sutlej Valley is inhabited by nomadic descendants of the Zhangzhung, who live in tiny villages of yak herders.

The Sutlej was the main medium of transportation for the kings of that time. In the early 18th century, it was used to transport devdar woods for Bilaspur district, Hamirpur district, and other places along the Sutlej's banks.

Of four rivers (Indus, Sutlej, Brahmaputra and Karnali/Ganges) mythically flowing out of holy Lake Manasarovar, the Sutlej is actually connected by channels that are dry most of the time. Earlier the river was also called as Shutudri or Zaradros river.

Gallery

See also
 List of rivers of India
 List of rivers of Pakistan
 Cis-Sutlej states
 Sulemanki Headworks
 Geology of the Himalaya

References

External links

 Sutlej basin marked on OpenStreetMap.
 Sutlej-Yamuna Link Canal is So Controversial? Wissurge,26 August 2020

Tributaries of the Indus River
Indus basin
Rivers of Tibet
Rivers of Sindh
International rivers of Asia
Rivers of Himachal Pradesh
Rivers of Punjab, India
Rigvedic rivers
India–Pakistan border
Border rivers
Rivers of India
Rivers of Punjab (Pakistan)
Rivers in Buddhism
Rivers of Pakistan